

Notable One O'Clock Lab Band Alumni

1930s, 40s & 50s 

 Bill Collins

1940s 

 Harry Babasin (1921–1988)
 Herb Ellis, UNT Hon. Doc. '97
 Jimmy Giuffre (1921–2008)
 Eugene Hall (1913–1993)
 Gene Roland (1921–1982)

1950s 

 Euel Box
 Ed Summerlin (1928–2006)

1960s 

 Dee Barton (1937–2001)
 Larry Cansler
 Bruce Fowler
 James A. Hall
 Billy Harper
 David Hungate
 Franklin D. "Bubba" Kolb
 Tom "Bones" Malone
 Lou Marini
 Dean Parks
 Jim Riggs
 Jay Saunders
 Ed Soph
 Marvin Stamm
 Bill Stapleton (1945–1984)
 Lanny Steele (1933–1994)

1970s 

 Bob Belden
 Leonard Candelaria
 James Chirillo
 Bill Collins
 Steve Duke
 Bill Evans
 Conrad Herwig
 Marc Johnson
 Lyle Mays
 Jim Milne
 John B. Riley
 Ray Sasaki
 Mike Smith
 Nick Vincent

1980s 

 Gregg Bissonette
 Mike Bogle
 Jeff Coffin
 Phil DeGreg
 Dave Pietro
 Tim Ries
 Jim Snidero
 Steve Wiest
 Mike Williams

1990s 

 Jami Dauber
 Scott Englebright
 Ari Hoenig
 Brad Turner

Student & Faculty Prolific Composers/Arrangers for the One O'Clock (non members)

1960s 

 Frank Mantooth

1970s 

 Rich Matteson ‡

‡ Faculty

Other Alumni 

 John Abercrombie
 Theodore Albrecht
 Jeff Antoniuk
 John Ardoin
 Steve Bailey
 Arthur Barrow
 William Basinski
 John Beasley
 Matt Bissonette
 William Blankenship
 Craig Bohmler
 Pat Boone
 Cary Boyce
 George Bragg
 Tom Brantley
 Zachary Breaux
 David Breeden
 Eden Brent
 Steven Bryant
 Ronnie Burrage
 Keith Carlock
 Don Carr
 Kristopher Carter
 Matt Chamberlain
 Alton Chung Ming Chan
 Kirk Covington
 Richard Croft ‡
 Carmen Cusack
 Ivan Davis
 Monte Hill Davis
 Michael Daugherty
 Beth Denisch
 Bob Dorough
 John M. Eargle
 Greg Edmonson
 David Egan
 Willard Elliot ‡
 Wilma Cozart Fine
 Jerry Fisher
 Jim Bob Floyd
 Eloy Fominaya
 Bruce Fowler (tenor)
 Robert Gauldin
 Adam Gaynor
 Don Gililland
 Don Gillis
 John Giordano ‡
 Floyd Graham ‡
 Michael Gungor
 Bob Hames
 Craig Handy
 Fareed Haque
 Everette Harp
 Earl Harvin
 Wiley Lee Housewright
 Jerry Hunt
 Dennis Irwin
 Norah Jones
 Brutal Juice
 Richard Kastle
 Eric Keyes
 Roger Kleier
 Bob Lanese
 Sue Ane Langdon
 Charles W. LaRue
 Lecrae
 William Franklin Lee III
 Hannibal Lokumbe
 Don Lucas
 Petronel Malan
 Eric Mandat
 Keshavan Maslak
 Paul Mazzio
 Midlake
 Moonmaids
 Latonia Moore
 Mark Nicolson
 Kevin Noe
 Shara Nova
 Raven Oak
 Spencer Perskin
 Jack Petersen ‡
 Emily Pulley
 Snarky Puppy
 Patricia Racette
 Jim Rotondi
 John Sheridan
 Julia Smith
 Jennifer Sowle
 Carolyn Steinberg
 B. W. Stevenson
 Fred Sturm
 Leonard Tan
 William Ennis Thomson
 Frederick C. Tillis
 Mark Trojanowski
 Fisher Tull
 Steve Turre
 Douglas Walter
 J.D. Walter
 Rodney Waschka II
 Alison Wedding
 David C. Williams
 Gary Willis
 Chuck Wilson
 Duain Wolfe
 Shara Worden
 Christopher Young

See also 
 List of University of North Texas College of Music faculty

North Texas
University of North Texas College of Music alumni